I.S. 237 or Rachel Carson Intermediate School 237Q is a public middle school in Flushing, Queens in New York City serving grades 6 - 8. The school is located on 46-21 Colden Street and part of NYCDOE District 25. 

Judith Friedman is the principal of the school, which has over 1200 students. The school uniform consists of color-coded shirts (green, grey, maroon) corresponding to each grade.

History
The school was named after scientist Rachel Carson, the writer of Silent Spring which inspired people to name the school after her; it opened in 1971. In 1999 the school took ownership of a park called Rachel Carson Playground, which is right across from the school.

East-West School of International Studies

The East-West School of International Studies (Public School Q281) is a combined middle and high school, serving students in grades 6-12 with an emphasis on Asian studies that shares the same building as I.S. 237. It first opened in September 2006 with 6th through 12th grade classes. 

The school occupies the 4th floor of the building, while sharing facilities like the cafeteria, auditorium, and gymnasium with I.S. 237. Student wear uniforms of pullovers, collared shirts (royal blue, light blue, or white) emblazoned with the school insignia, and dark pants other than jeans.

Operated by the New York City Department of Education, it is led by principal Anthony Cromer, has an average class size of 25 students, and has a student-teacher ratio of 14.9:1 in 2006-07,

The East-West School curriculum prepares students to graduate high school with a Regents' diploma and proficiency in Mandarin Chinese, Japanese, or Korean.

Clubs
Student groups and activities include erhu club, anime club, art, STEP team, dance team calligraphy, chess club, dance, film-making, MOUSE Squad (student computer maintenance), mentoring, Model United Nations, music, newspaper, peer tutoring, step club, Korean Traditional Painting, Korean dancing and singing, K-POP club, and student government. Athletic clubs and teams include basketball, yoga, martial arts, soccer, t'ai chi, judo, volleyball, and table tennis.

References

1971 establishments in New York City
Public middle schools in Queens, New York
Magnet schools in New York (state)
Flushing, Queens